Teius is a genus of lizard that belongs to the family Teiidae.

Classification
Listed alphabetically.
Teius oculatus (D’Orbigny & Bibron, 1837)
Teius suquiensis (Avila & Martori, 1991)
Teius teyou (Daudin, 1802) - four-toed tegu

See also
 Whiptail lizard

References

 
Lizard genera
Taxa named by Blasius Merrem